Longside Football Club are a Scottish football club from the village of Longside, seven miles west of Peterhead, Aberdeenshire. Members of the Scottish Junior Football Association, they currently play in the North First Division. The earliest club records date back to 1933 when the club played in local Amateur competitions. They joined the Aberdeenshire Amateur FA in 1974 and stepped up to Junior football in 1989. The club are based at Davidson Park and team colours are red and black

Honours
 North East Premier Division winners: 1999–00, 2000–01
 North East First Division winners: 1993–94
 Morrison Trophy: 1989–90, 1993–94, 2014–2015
 Aberdeen Cable TV Cup: 1994–95
 Jimmy Gibb Memorial Trophy: 1993–94, 1999–00

External links
 Club website
 Scottish Football Historical Archive
 Non-League Scotland

Football in Aberdeenshire
Football clubs in Scotland
Scottish Junior Football Association clubs
Association football clubs established in 1933
1933 establishments in Scotland